Haji Muhammad Ilyas Ansari is a Pakistani politician  who was a Member of the Provincial Assembly of the Punjab, from May 2013 to May 2018.

Early life and education
He was born on 25 August 1969 in Faisalabad.

He has completed matriculation education in 1985.

Political career

He was elected to the Provincial Assembly of the Punjab as a candidate of Pakistan Muslim League (Nawaz) from Constituency PP-65 (Faisalabad-XV) in 2013 Pakistani general election.

In December 2013, he was appointed as Parliamentary Secretary for social welfare and Baitul Mal.

References

Living people
Punjab MPAs 2013–2018
1969 births
Pakistan Muslim League (N) politicians